Demochroa is a genus of beetles in the family Buprestidae, containing the following species:

 Demochroa detanii Kurosawa, 1983
 Demochroa gratiosa Deyrolle, 1864
 Demochroa hashimotoi Kurosawa, 1991
 Demochroa kiyoshii Endo, 1993
 Demochroa lacordairei Thomson, 1859
 Demochroa masukoae Endo, 1993

References

Buprestidae genera